The Hockey East Best Defensive Defenseman is an annual award given out at the conclusion of the Hockey East regular season to the best defensive defenseman in the conference as voted by the head coaches of each Hockey East team.

The Best Defensive Defenseman was first bestowed in 1999 and every year thereafter.

Brian Dumoulin is the only defenseman to have won the award more than once, doing so in 2010–11 and 2011–12. The award has been shared once, in 2003–04 between Andrew Alberts of Boston College and Prestin Ryan of Maine. (As of 2022)

Award winners

Winners by school

See also
Hockey East Awards

References

General

Specific

External links
Hockey East Awards (Incomplete)

College ice hockey trophies and awards in the United States